Carlo Buccirosso (born 7 July 1954) is an Italian actor, theatre director and playwright.

As an actor, he's best known for his roles in comedy films, especially the ones by Vincenzo Salemme and Carlo Vanzina, in which he's often typecast as a stereotypical lower middle-class Neapolitan man. For his performance as corrupt politician Paolo Cirino Pomicino in Paolo Sorrentino's Il Divo (2008) he received critical praise and was nominated to David di Donatello for Best Supporting Actor. Buccirosso also appeared in Sorrentino's The Great Beauty (2013) and in popular TV series Un ciclone in famiglia (2006—2008) as Peppino Esposito.

In 2014, he won the Nastro d'Argento for Best Supporting Actor for his performance in crime-comedy Song'e Napule (2013). The following year, he won the David di Donatello for Best Supporting Actor for his performance in comedy The Legendary Giulia and Other Miracles (2015).

Filmography

Film

Television

References

External links 

Theatre people from Naples
1954 births
Living people
20th-century Italian dramatists and playwrights
David di Donatello winners
Italian male dramatists and playwrights
Italian male film actors
Italian male stage actors
Italian male television actors
Nastro d'Argento winners
Italian theatre directors
Male actors from Naples
20th-century Italian male writers